Mumbles Battery is a battery on the north coast of the Bristol Channel overlooking Swansea. It was built around the base of the Mumbles Lighthouse. It is one of the many Palmerston Forts built in response to a perceived French invasion, and was designed to protect Swansea Bay. Construction of the battery began in 1859 and was completed by 1861 at a cost of £8,760.

It mounted five 80 pounder rifled muzzle loading (RML) guns, two in casemates and three on the roof. From 1892 the battery was reduced to care and maintenance and used for practise by the Glamorganshire Artillery Volunteers. Between 1899 and 1901 the obsolete RML guns were removed and replaced by two 4.7-inch quick-firing (QF) guns on the roof of the battery.

During the Second World War the defences of the Bristol Channel were increased significantly. In 1940 the two 4.7-inch guns were operated by soldiers from the 531st (Glamorgan) Coast Regiment, Royal Artillery. Well before the end of the war, as the German threat decreased, the battery was placed into care and maintenance.

The battery was declared surplus to requirements in 1956 upon the dissolution of the UK’s coast artillery. The guns were dismounted and the battery disposed of.

References

Publications
 

Palmerston Forts
Artillery batteries